Fordham may refer to:

Education
 Fordham Preparatory School, an all-male, Jesuit high school in New York City
 Fordham University, a Jesuit university in New York City
 Fordham Rams, athletic teams of the above university
 Fordham University School of Law, a law school of the above university

Geography
 Fordham, Bronx, New York, United States
 Fordham Road, a major street in the above neighborhood
 Fordham (Metro-North station), a railway station in the above neighborhood
 Fordham, Pennsylvania, an unincorporated community
 Fordham, Wisconsin, United States, a ghost town
 Fordham, Cambridgeshire, England
 Fordham, Essex, England
 Fordham, Norfolk, England

Architecture
 The Fordham, a skyscraper in Chicago, Illinois
 Chicago Spire (originally proposed as Fordham Spire), a cancelled supertall skyscraper in Chicago, Illinois

Ships
 HMS Fordham, a Royal Navy Ham class minesweeper
 , a ship which was converted into a minesweeper during World War II

Other
 Fordham (surname)
 Fordham Company, a real estate development firm based in Chicago, Illinois
 Fordham Hospital, a former hospital in Fordham, Bronx
 Thomas B. Fordham Institute, a nonprofit education policy organization
 Fordham Experiment, an experiment on The Effects of Television in 1967 or 1968 at Fordham University
 Fordham (horse), a Thoroughbred racehorse

See also